Fusion Jonda is a Puerto Rican band that blends Caribbean music with gypsy-flamenco sounds, melodies, and rhythms. The band also centers its music around Afrobeat, jazz, Arabic, and Indian music and has a contemporary approach.

As for the band's name, the word Jonda, a Spanish anachronism for deep, is related to Cante Jondo (in English, Deep Singing), which is the origin of Flamenco. The band is based on flamenco roots, and the "Fusion" comes from the Hispanic, Indian and African harmonies that they inherited in the Caribbean.

History 
Fusion Jonda began in 2010 as a trio around its creator, musician-singer-songwriter Juan Luis Romero, percussionist Wilfredo "El Canela" Dávila, and flamenco dancer Patricia Muñiz. From Salsa music, and rock music to jazz sceneries, the music blends had not been unfamiliar to bandleader Romero, who is Puerto Rican and Dominican, and belongs to a family dedicated to music, poetry, journalism, law, and education. He studied piano and music composition at a very young age when he dreamed of producing musical interchanges between rhythms from the Antilles and Latin America. At age 13, he led his first orchestra. Afterwards, he had a jazz band, not without first being a singer for a heavy metal music band, the tenor of a Gospel music choir, chorister for the salsa legends Richie Ray & Bobby Cruz, and pianist for several Tropical music bands. He has also been a lawyer since 1990.

Fusion Jonda has evolved from being a flamenco trio to a one-of-a-kind musical ensemble; an array of talented musicians from different genres like reggae, rock, jazz, salsa, and world music bringing together the seductive sounds of the violin, the crispness of the trumpet, and trombone, the modern vibes of the bass and the exotic ethnic percussion. They all share the common goal of blending their collected inspirations, creating a new, sophisticated sound. Special appearances by urban poet and rapper Javier "Insurgente" Velázquez and a tribal fusion dancer also happen during their live performances.

The band achieved its first major break in 2012 when they received an invitation to perform at the José Miguel Agrelot Coliseum alongside Spanish singer Rosario Flores in front of a crowd of 15,000 during the 50th anniversary of the salsa orchestra El Gran Combo de Puerto Rico.

In 2013, the band released Fusion Jonda, their first Homonym album on its record label, New World Latino. The album was recorded in Puerto Rico and mastered in Battery Studios in New York by Mark Wilder. Moreover, the online magazine and website All About Jazz described Fusion Jonda's album as "...the perfect example of old-world vibe swathed with a new attitude yielding an exuberant production."

In 2014, Fusion Jonda performed the opening acts for Latin Grammy Award winners Concha Buika at the Luis A. Ferré Performing Arts Center in Puerto Rico and for Bajofondo at the Puerto Rico Convention Center.

Discography 
 Fusion Jonda

Band members 
 Juan Luis Romero – Music director, singer-songwriter, and guitarist
 Nayak Vallejo – Singer
 Javier "Insurgente" Velazquez – Rapper
 Patricia Muniz – Flamenco dancer
 William "Pipo" Torres – Bass player
 Wilfredo "El Canela" Davila – Percussionist
 Henry L. Rodriguez – Percussionist
 Eduardo "Sabu" Rosado – Percussionist
 Guillermo "El Profesor" Peguero – Violinist
 Joey Oyola – Trombonist
 Carlos Hernandez – Trumpet player

Awards 
 2014 – Fusion Jonda's album was selected as one of the 20 best discographic productions in Puerto Rico by the National Foundation for Popular Culture.

References

External links 
 
 
 

Musical groups established in 2010
Puerto Rican musical groups
Flamenco groups
2010 establishments in Puerto Rico